Wan Chai is a metropolitan area in Hong Kong.

Wan Chai may also refer to:

 Wan Chai (fighter) (born 1972), Burmese Lethwei fighter
 Wan Chai District, a district in Hong Kong
 Wan Chai station, a subway station in Hong Kong
 Wan Tsai, an area of Sai Kung Peninsula

See also
 Wanchai Ferry (disambiguation)